Eva Lucille Feldman, M.D., Ph.D., F.A.A.N., F.A.N.A. is an American physician-scientist and one of the world’s leading authorities on neurodegenerative disease. Currently, she serves as the Russell N. DeJong Professor of Neurology at the University of Michigan, as well as Director of the NeuroNetwork for Emerging Therapies and ALS Center of Excellence at Michigan Medicine.  She was also recently named the James W. Albers Distinguished University Professor of Neurology.

Feldman has made contributions to biomedical research and clinical care in many critical areas of neurodegenerative disease.  Her primary focus has been on amyotrophic lateral sclerosis (ALS), Alzheimer's disease, cognitive decline, and the neurologic complications of diabetes and obesity, as well as how environmental toxins affect the nervous system. She also has conducted pioneering research on developing stem cell therapies to treat these diseases.

She is annually listed in Best Doctors in America and is a member of the Association of American Physicians and National Academy of Medicine. She is a Fellow of the American Association for the Advancement of Science. Feldman has authored over 500 articles, 70 book chapters (Google Scholar h-index = 109) with >45,000 citations. She has been continuously NIH funded since 1989 and has received numerous awards and honors throughout her remarkable career.

Early life and education
Eva Feldman grew up in Indiana and completed her undergraduate degree in biology at Earlham College with honors, followed by an M.S. in zoology at the University Notre Dame.  Feldman then went on to receive both her M.D. and Ph.D. at the University of Michigan as a Rackham Scholar.  She completed her Neurology residency at Johns Hopkins, where she served as Chief Resident and received The Johns Hopkins Award for Medical Teaching and Excellence, the first neurologist to receive this award at Hopkins. Dr. Feldman then returned to the University of Michigan to complete a neuromuscular disorders fellowship, with longtime mentor Dr. James Albers, and her career has since progressed to her current role as the Russell N. DeJong Professor of Neurology and Director of both the NeuroNetwork for Emerging Therapies and ALS Center of Excellence.

Career
In 1988, Feldman became an assistant professor and opened her basic science laboratory in the Department of Neurology at Michigan Medicine, serving as member of the Neuroscience Program and Michigan Diabetes Research and Training Center. In 1994, she became an associate professor, and in 1998 she joined the faculty of the Cellular and Molecular Biology Program.

In 2000, Feldman became director of the Juvenile Diabetes Research Foundation Center for the Study of Complications in Diabetes (until 2010), Director of the ALS Center of Excellence at Michigan Medicine, and a fully endowed professor, the Russell N. DeJong Professor of Neurology. In 2005, she was named the Director of Michigan Medicine’s Neuropathy Center. She was appointed the inaugural Director of the A. Alfred Taubman Medical Research Institute in 2007, after U-M received a multimillion-dollar gift from A. Alfred Taubman for its creation.

Feldman is the author of more than 500 articles, 71 book chapters, and four books. Her research has been funded continually by the National Institutes of Health (NIH) for over 30 years, and she currently is the principal investigator or co-Investigator of grants funded by the NIH, including the NIH Director’s Transformative Research Award in 2021, as well as grants from the Centers for Disease Control and Prevention’s Agency for Toxic Substances and Disease Registry, the Juvenile Diabetes Research Foundation and private foundations. Feldman also leads multiple clinical trials focused on understanding and treating neurological disorders, with an emphasis on ALS and neuropathy. 

Feldman served as President of the Peripheral Nerve Society from 2007-2009 and President of the American Neurological Association (ANA) from 2011-2013. At that time, she was only the third woman elected as ANA President in 130 years. She was the first woman in 25 years to receive the Robert S. Schwab Award from the American Clinical Neurophysiology Society. She is also the only U-M alumnus to receive both Early and Distinguished Career Achievement Awards from the U-M Medical Alumni Society.  This year, she was also given the University of Michigan's most prestigious honor, a Distinguished University Professorship, which was named after her longtime mentor James Albers, M.D., Ph.D. Among her many honors, Feldman is an elected member of the National Academy of Medicine (NAM) and Association of American Physicians, and a Fellow of the American Association for the Advancement of Science. As of 2020, she chairs the NAM Neurology and Psychiatry Section.  Feldman is the Editor of the Contemporary Neurology Series and also serves on a number of editorial boards for leading scientific journals, including The Lancet Neurology, Nature Reviews Neurology, JAMA Neurology and Journal of Neurology, Neurosurgery and Psychiatry.

A. Alfred Taubman Medical Research Institute 
In 2007, the A. Alfred Taubman Medical Research Institute was founded to support the research of physician-scientists, with the goal of empowering medical scientists to expand the boundaries of scientific discovery, develop new medical therapies, and alleviate human suffering caused by diseases. Under Dr. Feldman’s leadership, the Taubman Institute funded senior-level physician-scientists in a broad spectrum of diseases but with special attention on adult and childhood cancer, cardiovascular and metabolic diseases, and neurological conditions such as ALS, Alzheimer’s disease and the diabetic neuropathy. The Institute’s funding focused on supporting “translational” research; the kind that transforms laboratory discoveries into treatments for patients. 

She also established an Emerging Scholars program to support promising early-career physician scientists at the Taubman Institute, which has provided unencumbered seed funding to over 20 junior investigators, with an emphasis on improving the diversity of the clinician-scientist workforce. 

Dr. Feldman served as Director of the Taubman Institute for 10 years and had remarkable success in fulfilling the founder’s vision. It now supports the work of over 40 of the University’s most prominent and promising clinician-scientists, almost half of which are in the Emerging Scholar Program she began. Notably, Taubman Institute funding has also led to multiple human clinical trials in cancer therapy, autoimmune diseases, and neurological diseases, including Dr. Feldman’s own first human clinical trial of a stem cell treatment for ALS noted above.

Stem cell initiative 
In addition to her role in academia, Dr. Feldman has been a leading spokesperson on issues related to medical science to the general community, frequently appearing in public and in the media. She has been a true ambassador for medical science. This was never more evident than the role she and the Taubman Institute played in the 2008 election when Michigan voters passed a constitutional amendment easing restrictions on embryonic stem cell research. Appearing on numerous television and radio programs, in newspaper articles and public speaking engagements, she was one of the main educators on the value of such research in the understanding and treatment of diseases. In the final days before the election, Dr. Feldman spoke alongside former President Bill Clinton at a large educational rally.  

In the following year, Dr. Feldman announced the formation of the Consortium of Stem Cell Therapies at the Taubman Institute, the first facility to produce embryonic stem cell lines in Michigan and one of only a handful in the nation.

Center for RNA Biomedicine at the University of Michigan 
In the fall of 2015, under the leadership of Dr. Feldman, the Taubman Institute collaborated in the creation of the now-established Center for RNA Biomedicine at the University of Michigan. It promotes and develops promotes and develops cross-disciplinary collaborations on RNA research across campus.

NeuroNetwork for Emerging Therapies 
Feldman’s scientific (basic science) laboratory was initially established in 1988 and was later named the Program for Neurology Research and Discovery. In the proceeding 20 years, her lab grew to over 30 scientists and was renamed The NeuroNetwork for Emerging Therapies (www.mneuronet.org) in 2020. The mission of Feldman's research remains the same: to advance scientific discovery and establish therapies for neurological diseases.

ALS Center of Excellence at Michigan Medicine 
After initially taking over the ALS Clinic at Michigan Medicine, now the Pranger ALS Clinic, Feldman combined ALS patient care and ALS clinical and scientific research.  The newly formed ALS Center of Excellence at Michigan Medicine was certified by the ALS Association. Patient care and clinical trials happen through Pranger ALS Clinic, while basic science research is conducted through the NeuroNetwork.  All ALS-related activities at the separate entities are merged under the ALS Center of Excellence to build a true bench to bedside framework, now directed by Feldman, with Dr. Stephen Goutman, Director of the Pranger ALS Clinic, serving as the associate director.

Mentorship 
Feldman sees some of her greatest accomplishments as guiding and supporting the future of medical science through mentoring and inspiring the next generation of scientists and physicians. Nine scientists have received their Ph.D. degrees under her tutelage, and she has trained more than 100 postdoctoral fellows and neurologists to specialize in the understanding and treatment of neurological diseases.

Research

Amyotrophic Lateral Schlerosis (ALS) 
Feldman is renowned for her groundbreaking research in amyotrophic lateral sclerosis (ALS), an invariably fatal nerve affliction more commonly known as Lou Gehrig’s disease. In fact, her work developing a stem cell therapy for ALS has resulted in the first FDA-approved human clinical trial for a stem cell treatment for this condition. The Phase 1 and 2 trials supported the safety and feasibility of transplanting up to 16 million stem cells into the spinal cord of ALS subjects.  This is just one of the many influential advances that have emanated from her laboratory.

She has made national headlines for work uncovering links between ALS risk and pesticide exposures, and she and her team received a method-of-use patent in 2018 to repurpose a family of drugs, the Jakinibs, for use in ALS treatment based on her data identifying a novel mechanism by which the immune system contributes to disease progression. In October 2021, she received the esteemed NIH Director’s Transformative Award as the leader of an interdisciplinary team from Michigan Medicine and the School of Public Health that employs novel approaches to “omics” clinical data with the goal of making ALS a preventable disease. Announcing the grant, Dr. Francis Collins, who was then NIH Director, stated that these “innovative researchers have the potential to transform the biomedical field,” going on to say that recipients of the award “will revolutionize our approaches to biomedical research through their groundbreaking work.”

Dr. Feldman also founded the University of Michigan ALS Consortium, establishing a biorepository for ALS, which has facilitated identification of epigenetic, transcriptomic, metabolomic, and immunological unique signatures in ALS along with potential biomarkers. Her work has also identified new ALS therapeutic targets, as well as environmental toxins that are potentially risk factors for the disease.

Neuropathy and diabetes complications 
Feldman is equally known internationally for her work in diabetes complications, particularly peripheral neuropathy.  She received the Juvenile Diabetes Research Foundation Mary Jane Kugel Award twice (2003 and 2005), the American Diabetes Association Lifetime Achievement Award (2006), Endocrine Society Gerald D. Aurbach Award for Outstanding Translational Research (2017), and the Peripheral Nerve Society Alan J. Gebhart Prize for Excellence in Peripheral Nerve Research (2019).

Her efforts over the past 30 years in this area have changed practice guidelines for diagnosing early prediabetic neuropathy. Her early work developing the Michigan Neuropathy Screening Instrument (MNSI) has led to the tool’s widespread global use to diagnose neuropathy. She has uncovered important roles for lipids and the metabolic syndrome in neuropathy pathogenesis in prediabetes and type 2 diabetes and is an author on the American Diabetes Association Guidelines on the treatment of diabetic neuropathy. She is currently developing risk assessment tools to inform the care of COVID-19 patients with type 2 diabetes during this health crisis as well as pandemics to come, while also studying the neurological implications of patients with Long COVID.

Brain health and Alzheimer’s disease 
Dr. Feldman is leading efforts to understand how metabolic dysfunction drives neurologic complications and impacts brain health. Her team found a correlation between diabetes and Alzheimer’s disease, and she has initiated a landmark study to understand how diabetes and obesity contribute to dementia. Feldman’s lab is also exploring the effects of good versus. bad fats on memory, as well as how gut health affects nerve function in both the brain and peripheral nerves.

Using the knowledge gained from her ALS stem-cell research, Feldman is developing a similar stem-cell therapy for Alzheimer’s disease, which, if approved, would be the first in-human clinical trial of its kind in medical history.

Sources
 A. Alfred Taubman Medical Research Institute 
 The University of Michigan Health System 
 The American Neurological Association

References

External links 
 
 PubMed Publications

See also
University of Michigan Medicine Biography

Living people
American Jews
American neurologists
Earlham College alumni
Physicians from New York City
Notre Dame College of Arts and Letters alumni
University of Michigan faculty
University of Michigan Medical School alumni
Scientists from New York (state)
Year of birth missing (living people)
Women neurologists
20th-century American physicians
20th-century American women physicians
21st-century American physicians
21st-century American women physicians
American women academics
Members of the National Academy of Medicine